Rotting Civilisation is the debut album by British punk rock band Septic Tank. The album was released on 13 April 2018 through Rise Above Records. In an interview with Blabbermouth, Dorrian said:

Personnel
Septic Tank

Credits adapted from Metal Forces:
Lee Dorrian – vocals
Garry Jennings –  guitars
Scott Carlson – bass
Jaime Gómez Arellano – drums, mastering, mixing

Additional personnel

Stewart Easton - Artwork
Mark Griffiths - Graphic design, text

Track listing

Track listing adapted from Metal Hammer:

References

2018 albums
Septic Tank (band) albums
Rise Above Records albums